Amphibolips nubilipennis, known generally as the translucent oak gall wasp, is a species of gall wasp in the family Cynipidae. Its range includes Ontario, Quebec, and much of the eastern United States. Hosts include Quercus buckleyi, Quercus coccinea, Quercus falcata, Quercus ilicifolia, Quercus imbricaria, Quercus marilandica, Quercus rubra, and Quercus velutina.

The translucent oak gall is induced by the sexual generation of Amphibolips nubilipennis. This gall is succulent and accumulates high concentration of malic acid causing a low pH of gall tissues. The extreme acidity of the translucent oak gall tissues has been proposed to represent a defensive strategy against parasitoid wasps.

References 

Cynipidae
Fauna of the Eastern United States
Insects of Canada
Insects described in 1841
Gall-inducing insects
Oak galls